Cabahan (also known as Cabangahan or Puro Island) is an island in the province of Romblon in the Philippines. It has one sitio named Cabangahan, which is a part of barangay Guinbirayan, Santa Fe, Romblon. The local name of the island is Puro, which means "Island" in  Onhan language; which is the native language of the island's inhabitants.

The island was formerly an island barrio of Santa Fe, Romblon that existed from 1901 to 1917. In the 1903 Census on population, it had 24 residents.

Geography 
Its south and east shores are formed by red, rocky cliffs, and its west and north shores are bordered by mangroves.

See also 
List of islands of the Philippines

References

External links 
 Cabangahan Island at OpenStreetMap

Islands of Romblon
Sitios and puroks of the Philippines